Attack on Titan: The Musical is a 2023 musical theatre adaptation of the manga and anime series of the same name. The script is written by Masafumi Hata, based on a story by Hajime Isayama, with music by KEN the 390. Gō Ueki is slated to be the director of the production.

The musical premiered in Japan on January 7, 2023.

Development
An Attack on Titan stage show was originally developed around 2016. It was announced in the release of Volume 21 of the manga. However, during rehearsals, acrobat Kazutaka Yoshino was injured while testing the ODM gear mechanics. He later died in the hospital, causing the play to be cancelled. In 2022, it was announced that a new musical would be brought to the stage. A poster and trailer were both released on September 5. Reception was mostly positive, although there were some who noted that they hoped the production would be more careful.

Attack on Titan creator Hajime Isayama noted that he had initial worries about the production because of the accident, but stated that he felt like the new company would be much more careful and that he was looking forward to the production. A key visual was released on October 21st, with photos of the individual characters released as well.

Synopsis
100 years ago, man-eating giants known as Titans decimated humanity. The survivors built three walls to ensure their survival, until one day, they are reminded that they are trapped in a birdcage. A young Eren Yeager swears to destroy all of the Titans.

Cast
 Kurumu Okamiya as Eren Yeager
 Sara Takatsuki as Mikasa Ackerman
 Eito Konishi as Armin Arlert
 Ryo Matsuda as Levi
 Yū Fukuzawa as Jean Kirstein
 Yasue Kazuaki as Marco Bott
 Tomoya Nakanishi as Connie Springer
 Sena as Sasha Braus
 Mitsu Murata as Hannes
 Takeshi Hayashino as Keith Shadis
 Masanori Tomita as Dimo Reeves
 Mimi Maihane as Carla Jaeger
 Mitsuru Karahashi as Grisha Jaeger
 Riona Tatemichi as Hange Zoe
 Takurō Ōno as Erwin Smith

Productions
The show is set to debut in the Orix theater from January 7–9, before moving to Nippon Seinenkan Hall from January 14–24.

References

External links
 Official website

Attack on Titan
Musicals based on anime and manga